Phil Slater is an Australian jazz trumpeter and composer based in the Illawarra region.

Slater has performed and recorded with a wide range of artists including Archie Roach, Missy Higgins, the Australian Art Orchestra, Lou Reed, Jim Black, Jonathan Zwartz, Katie Noonan, Vince Jones, Bernie McGann, Sandy Evans, Paul Grabowsky, Genevieve Lacey, PNAU, Directions In Groove,  Nick Littlemore, Andrea Keller, Barney McAll, and Gian Slater.  In the 1990s he studied composition with Peter Sculthorpe, Barry Conynham and Andrew Ford at the University of Sydney and University of Wollongong.

During the 1990s and 2000s Slater was a prominent member of the Sydney jazz and improvisation community and led a number of un-recorded projects including The Fresh Kills (with Samuel Dixon, Carl Dewhurst, and Simon Barker), the Very Interactive Band, the Whistle Stop Trio (with Carl Dewhurst and Simon Barker), and the Phil Slater Quartet (with Matt McMahon, Lloyd Swanton and Simon Barker).

Since the early 2000s Slater became the leader or co-leader of a number of award winning projects including Strobe Coma Virgo, Band of Five Names, Daorum, and Trace Sphere.  Slater has composed and performed original music for many theatre, film and television productions including Stuff Happens and Exit The King for Belvoir Street Theatre, Mother Courage, Gallipoli, and King Lear with Sydney Theatre Company, the Tale of Samulnori with Legs On The Wall.

Slater has been awarded the Australian National Jazz Award, the Bell Award for Australian Jazz Artist of the Year, the Bell Award for Best Australian Contemporary Jazz Ensemble (Phil Slater Quartet), the Limelight Award for Outstanding Contribution to Australian Jazz, and the Freedman Fellowship.

In 2019 he released The Dark Pattern. Playing with him on the album were Simon Barker (drums), Matt McMahon (piano), Matt Keegan (saxophone) and Brett Hirst (bass). The album saw him nominated for the 2019 ARIA Award for Best Jazz Album.

Discography

And featured on
Band of Five Names by Band of Five Names (1999) 
Severence by Band of Five Names (2002) 
Empty Gardens by Band of Five Names (2006) 
Daorum by Daorum  (2008) - Kimnara

Awards and nominations

AIR Awards
The Australian Independent Record Awards (commonly known informally as AIR Awards) is an annual awards night to recognise, promote and celebrate the success of Australia's Independent Music sector.

|-
| AIR Awards of 2020
| The Dark Pattern
| Best Independent Jazz Album or EP
| 
|-

ARIA Music Awards
The ARIA Music Awards is an annual awards ceremony that recognises excellence, innovation, and achievement across all genres of Australian music. 

! 
|-
| 2019
| The Dark Pattern
| Best Jazz Album
| 
| 
|-

Australian Jazz Bell Awards
The Australian Jazz Bell Awards, (also known as the Bell Awards or The Bells), are annual music awards for the jazz music genre in Australia. They commenced in 2003.

|-
| 2004
| Phil Slater
| Australian Jazz Artist of the Year
| 
|-
| 2008
| Phil Slater Quartet
| Best Australian Jazz Ensemble
| 
|-

wins only

References

External links
Phil Slater

Australian musicians
Living people
Year of birth missing (living people)